Izad Khvast-e Basri (also Romanized as Īzad Khvāst-e Bāşrī; also known as Īzad Khvāst) is a village in Darian Rural District, in the Central District of Shiraz County, Fars Province, Iran. At the 2006 census, its population was 1,642, in 389 families.

References 

Populated places in Shiraz County